The 2014–15 Macedonian Third Football League was the 23rd season of the third-tier football league in the Republic of Macedonia, since its establishment. It began in August 2014 and ended on 24 May 2015.

North

Teams

League table

South

Teams

League table

East

Teams

League table

West

Teams

1 Vrapchishte was in the first part of season participated as Vëllazërimi.

League table

Southwest

Teams

League table

See also
2014–15 Macedonian Football Cup
2014–15 Macedonian First Football League
2014–15 Macedonian Second Football League

References

External links
MacedonianFootball.com
Football Federation of Macedonia 

Macedonia 3
3
Macedonian Third Football League seasons